American rock band Of Mice & Men has released seven studio albums, one live album, three extended plays (EPs), 30 singles and 25 music videos.

The band released their first album of the same name, was released on March 9, 2010, and successfully entered the US Billboard 200, peaking at number 115. In the following year, they released their second album titled The Flood, which also released three singles; "Still YDG'N", "Purified" and "The Depths", neither charted. The Flood, however peaked at number 28 in the US.

The band did not release any new material until late 2013, where they released their first single for their 2014 album Restoring Force, titled "You're Not Alone". This was the band's first single to have charted in the US but was also the band's first efforts to have charted in the UK charts. The album itself was released on January 28, 2014, and had charted at number four in the US, number 17 in the UK and also number 36 in New Zealand and number nine in Australia, making it both the first album to chart internationally and the band's highest charting album to date.

Albums

Studio albums

Notes

Live albums

Extended plays

Singles

As featured artist

Music videos

References

Discographies of American artists
Post-hardcore group discographies
Heavy metal group discographies